Sir Henry Moody, 1st Baronet (c. 1582 – 23 April 1629) was an English politician who sat in the House of Commons between 1625 and 1629.

Ancestry

Moody's family had moved from Worcestershire to Malmesbury, Wiltshire, by the end of the 15th century, where they leased property and pastureland from Malmesbury Abbey. The family came to prominence amongst the gentry of Wiltshire subsequent to their acquisition, by royal grant, of several of the Abbey's estates, including Garsdon manor, subsequent to the Dissolution of the Monasteries. By 1544 the Moody family acquired the Whitchurch and Cleverton manors, both near Malmesbury, and extensive acreage elsewhere.

Sir Henry was the son of Richard Moody (d. 1612), and the grandson of Richard Moody (d. 1550). Sir Henry's mother was Christiana Barwick, daughter of John Barwick, of Wilcot, Wiltshire.

Career

He was knighted at Whitehall on 18 March 1606. From 1618 to 1619, he was Sheriff of Wiltshire. He was created baronet on 11 March 1622. In 1625, he was elected Member of Parliament for Malmesbury. He was re-elected MP for Malmesbury in 1626 and 1628 and sat until 1629 when King Charles decided to rule without parliament for eleven years. 
 
Moody died at Garesdon about a month after the dissolution of parliament, at the age of about 46.

Moody married on 20 January 1606 to Deborah Dunch, daughter of Walter Dunch of Avebury, Wiltshire and his wife Deborah Pilkington, daughter of James Pilkington, Bishop of Durham. She was a Nonconformist and, after Moody's death in 1629, emigrated to Massachusetts in 1636. In 1643 she was granted land in the southwestern part of the Dutch settlement in western Long Island, where she founded Gravensande between December 1654 and May 1659.

The 1st Baronet's son, also Henry, who was a cavalier during the English Civil War, inherited the baronetcy.

References

1580s births
1629 deaths
Baronets in the Baronetage of England
High Sheriffs of Wiltshire
English MPs 1625
English MPs 1626
English MPs 1628–1629
Place of birth missing